Spinatous fossa may refer to:

 Infraspinatous fossa
 Supraspinatous fossa